Chami may refer to:

Chami-Embera language (or just Chami), an indigenous American language spoken in north western South America
Cyril August Chami (born 1964), a Tanzanian politician
Douar Ain Chami, a settlement in northwestern Morocco somewhat to the north of the city of Meknes
Nymphargus chami, a species of frog in the family Centrolenidae, formerly placed in the genus Cochranella